Galactomyia (commonly known as the feather-legged fly or hairy-legged fly) is a subgenus of tachinid flies. They are found in North and South America.

Species
Trichopoda bosqi (Blanchard, 1966)
Trichopoda christenseni (Blanchard, 1966)
Trichopoda giacomelli (Blanchard, 1966)
Trichopoda lanipes Fabricius, 1805
Trichopoda limbata (Blanchard, 1966)
Trichopoda nigrifrontalis (Blanchard, 1966)
Trichopoda pennipes Fabricius, 1781

References

External links
 Photographs of Trichopoda pennipes

Tachinidae
Diptera of North America
Diptera of South America
Insect subgenera